Beornoth is only recorded in the report in the Anglo-Saxon Chronicle of the death of "Brihtsige, son of the ætheling Beornoth" in the Battle of the Holme in East Anglia in 902. He was probably descended from Mercian kings.

References

External links 
 

Year of birth missing
Year of death missing
9th-century English people